The 16th Ryder Cup Matches were held 7–9 October 1965 at Royal Birkdale Golf Club in Southport, England. For the first time commercialisation started to make a presence on site. The United States team won the competition by a score of 19 to 12 points.

Format
The Ryder Cup is a match play event, with each match worth one point.  From 1963 through 1971 the competition format was as follows:
Day 1 — 8 foursomes (alternate shot) matches, 4 each in morning and afternoon sessions
Day 2 — 8 four-ball (better ball) matches, 4 each in morning and afternoon sessions
Day 3 — 16 singles matches, 8 each in morning and afternoon sessions
With a total of 32 points, 16 points were required to win the Cup.  All matches were played to a maximum of 18 holes.

Teams
Source:

The British team was determined using a points system. Compared to the system used in 1963, there was more emphasis on high finishes, points only being allocated to the leading 20 rather than the leading 40. Points were based on the actual finishing position, whereas previously non-eligible players had been excluded in determining positions. In addition, points were earned in a number of  invitation events, including the Dunlop Masters, the Martini International and the Esso Golden Tournament. The Open champion remained an automatic choice but the News of the World Match Play champion was no longer guaranteed a place. Counting tournaments started with the 1964 Carroll Sweet Afton Tournament and finished with the 1965 Esso Golden Tournament. For the 1965 event the British PGA reduced the period that a tournament professional had to wait before becoming eligible for the Ryder Cup team from five years to three. This meant that ex-amateur golfers like Guy Wolstenholme (who turned professional in late 1960) and Doug Sewell (1961) became eligible. The field for the 1965 Esso Golden Tournament were the first 15 in the Ryder Cup points list. Before the event the leading seven were guaranteed their place in the team; the remaining eight being in contention for the three remaining places. Jimmy Hitchcock and Dave Thomas who were 8th and 9th before the event retained their places in the top 10 but Wolstenholme, who started 10th, was passed by George Will, the winner of the tournament.

Despite having won his fourth major title as a professional at the Masters Tournament in April, 25-year-old Jack Nicklaus was not a member of the U.S. team. Eligibility rules set by the PGA prevented him from participating in the Ryder Cup until 1969. He competed as a player through 1981, missing only the 1979 edition, and was the non-playing captain of the U.S. team in 1983 and 1987.

Pott did not play due to a back injury.

Thursday's matches

Morning foursomes

Afternoon foursomes

Friday's matches

Morning four-ball

Afternoon four-ball

Saturday's matches

Morning singles

Afternoon singles

Individual player records
Each entry refers to the win–loss–half record of the player.

Source:

Great Britain

United States

Johnny Pott did not play in any matches.

References

External links
PGA of America: 1965 Ryder Cup 

Ryder Cup
Golf tournaments in England
Sport in Lancashire
Sport in Southport
Ryder Cup
Ryder Cup
Ryder Cup
20th century in Lancashire